Mordellistena rufula is a species of beetle in the genus Mordellistena of the family Mordellidae. It was described by Helmuth.

References

rufula